Romeo Jozak (born 11 October 1972) is a Croatian football manager and former player who most recently managed the Kuwait national team.

Early career
Jozak grew up in a family of mathematics and physics teachers. He ended his football career early due to a serious injury at the age of twenty-two while playing at the club NK Orijent Rijeka. During the Croatian War of Independence, he stayed in Zagreb. Soon after he was awarded a scholarship to the United States, where he also worked as an instructor at youth summer camps. After returning, he started training with Ilija Lončarević, assisting him as an assistant at Dinamo Zagreb (2001–2002 and 2004–2005), the Libya team (2003–2004 and 2005–2006) and NK Osijek (2006–2008). At the same time, he completed his doctorate education at the Faculty of Kinesiology at the University of Zagreb.

Coaching career

Early steps
He parted ways with the Croatian Football Federation in March 2017. Then returning to Dinamo Zagreb as a sports director, but he only staying there for four months. After the dismissal of Dinamo Zagreb's head coach, Ivaylo Petev, Jozak hinted at taking over for the vacant head coach position. The board replaced Petev with Mario Cvitanović and Jozak soon after decided to resign.

Legia Warsaw
On 13 September 2017, Jozak was hired as the manager of Polish club Legia Warsaw. On 14 April 2018, after his team lost 0–1 to Zagłębie Lubin, he was fired and replaced by his assistant Dean Klafurić.

Kuwait national team
On 27 July 2018, Romeo Jozak was hired as Kuwait national team head coach. On 12 September 2019, Romeo Jozak was fired following a home defeat to Australia.

Columbus Blast FC Soccer Academy

Romeo Jozak made a significant investment and became the majority owner of Columbus’ Blast FC Soccer Academy in Columbus, Ohio, which is the longest running youth soccer program in Central Ohio.

Saudi Arabia
On 22 July 2021, Romeo Jozak was hired as Saudi Arabia Technical Director.

Managerial statistics 
As of 30 June 2021

References

External links
 Romeo Jozak  Official website 

1972 births
Living people
Footballers from Rijeka
Association footballers not categorized by position
Croatian footballers
HNK Orijent players
Croatian football managers
GNK Dinamo Zagreb non-playing staff
Legia Warsaw managers
Kuwait national football team managers
Croatian expatriate football managers
Expatriate football managers in Poland
Croatian expatriate sportspeople in Poland
Expatriate football managers in Kuwait
Croatian expatriate sportspeople in Kuwait
Croatian expatriate sportspeople in Saudi Arabia